Prince of Penzance is a New Zealand-bred Thoroughbred race horse who won the 2015 Melbourne Cup. He was trained by Darren Weir. In the race, he was ridden by Michelle Payne, who became the first female jockey to win the race.

Background
Prince of Penzance is a bay gelding with a white blaze bred by Rich Hill Stud in the Matamata region of New Zealand's North Island. He was sired by Pentire, a British horse who recorded his biggest win in the 1996 King George VI and Queen Elizabeth Stakes and had his biggest success in New Zealand where he sired  Mufhasa (Telegraph Handicap), Rangirangdoo (Doncaster Mile) and Xcellent as well as Prince of Penzance. His dam Royal Successor is a daughter of the Irish-bred mare Only Royale who won the Yorkshire Oaks in 1993 and 1994.
The name is a reference to the place name of Penzance in Cornwall.

Racing career
Prince of Penzance's first notable win was in autumn 2014, in the Listed Mornington Cup Prelude. Races in the remainder of the year, and in early 2015, resulted in wins and placings, including a win in the Moonee Valley Gold Cup, a second place in the Queen Elizabeth Handicap and a third in the Zipping Classic. In the 2015 Melbourne Cup, Prince of Penzance started a 100/1 outsider in a 24-runner field. The Japanese challenger Fame Game was the 4/1 favourite ahead of British gelding Trip To Paris, the winner of the Ascot Gold Cup. Other overseas contenders included Max Dynamite, Bondi Beach and Kingfisher from Ireland, Big Orange (Goodwood Cup), Snow Sky (Hardwicke Stakes), Quest For More (Northumberland Plate) and Red Cadeaux from England and Hokko Brave from Japan. The best of the Australian-trained contingent appeared to be Preferment (Turnbull Stakes), Almoonqith (Geelong Cup) and Criterion (Australian Derby). Prince of Penzance was always travelling strongly, took the lead in the last 100 metres and won by half a length from Max Dynamite with Criterion in third.

Pedigree

References

Further reading

Racehorses bred in New Zealand
2009 racehorse births
Thoroughbred family 9-e
Melbourne Cup winners